Suzy Saxophone or Saxophone Suzy is a 1928 French-German silent comedy film directed by Karel Lamač and starring Anny Ondra and Hans Albers. It was shot at the Johannisthal Studios in Berlin. The film's art direction was by Carl Ludwig Kirmse.

Cast

References

Bibliography

External links

1928 films
Films of the Weimar Republic
French silent feature films
German silent feature films
Films directed by Karel Lamač
German black-and-white films
Films shot at Johannisthal Studios
1928 comedy films
German comedy films
French comedy films

1920s German films